Ben (born Bernhard Albrecht Matthias Lasse Blümel on 15 May 1981 in Berlin) is a German singer, songwriter, and occasional voice actor and TV host.

His greatest success was 2002 with the hit single "Engel", a collaboration with singer Gim. He was also successful as TV presenter of the music show The Dome (RTL II), Toggo Music (Super RTL) and Bravo TV (Pro 7).

He was the narrator in the German version of the 2006 Canadian-French animal film The White Planet.

Discography

Albums 
 Hörproben (2002)
 Leben leben (2003)

Singles 
2002 – "Engel" (featuring Gim)
2002 – "Herz aus Glas"
2002 – "Gesegnet seist du"
2003 – "Wunder geschehn" (Nena & Friends)
2003 – "Kleider machen Leute"
2003 – "Verliebt"
2005 – "Manchmal"
2006 – "Vorbei" (with U96)
2007 – "Bedingungslos / Einmalig" (with Kate Hall)
2007 – "Du bist wie Musik" (with Kate Hall)
2007 – "Ich lieb' dich immer noch so sehr" (with Kate Hall)
2008 – "2 Herzen" (with Kate Hall)

DVDs 
2002 – Gesegnet seist Du (DVD single)
2003 – Hörproben live (DVD video)

Awards 
2002 – Bravo Otto in Silver, Category Singer
2003 – Die Goldene Stimmgabel
2005 – Bravo Otto in Bronce, Category Best TV Star (male)

External links

References 

1981 births
Living people
21st-century German male singers
German pop singers
German television presenters
Waldorf school alumni